Here be dragons is a phrase used on geographical maps.

Here be dragons, Here there be dragons, or There be dragons may also refer to:

Literature

 Here Be Dragons, a 1985 historical novel by Sharon Kay Penman
 Here Be Dragons: Science, Technology and the Future of Humanity, a 2016 book by Olle Häggström
 Here There Be Dragons, written 1968, a children's book by Roger Zelazny
 Here, There Be Dragons, a 2006 fantasy novel by James A. Owen

Other uses

 Here Be Dragons, started in 2014, a BBC Radio Wales comedy sketch show
 There Be Dragons, a 2011 film by Roland Joffé

See also
 Here be monsters
 Here there be tygers